Walter Junio da Silva Clementino or simply Walter Minhoca (born January 12, 1982 in Betim), is a Brazilian attacking midfielder who currently plays for Clube de Regatas Brasil.

Honours
Flamengo
Brazilian Cup: 2006

Contract
Ipatinga (Loan) 1 January 2007 to 31 January 2007
Cruzeiro 1 July 2005 to 30 June 2010

References

External links

CBF 
footballplus 
Com liminar garantida, Walter Minhoca deixa o Ipatinga 

1982 births
Living people
Brazilian footballers
Brazilian expatriate footballers
Campeonato Brasileiro Série A players
Cruzeiro Esporte Clube players
Sociedade Esportiva e Recreativa Caxias do Sul players
Ipatinga Futebol Clube players
Avaí FC players
América Futebol Clube (MG) players
C.S. Marítimo players
CR Flamengo footballers
Botafogo Futebol Clube (SP) players
Guarani FC players
Al-Qadsiah FC players
Associação Desportiva São Caetano players
Brasiliense Futebol Clube players
ABC Futebol Clube players
Clube de Regatas Brasil players
Expatriate footballers in South Korea
Expatriate footballers in Saudi Arabia
Daejeon Hana Citizen FC players
K League 1 players
Brazilian expatriate sportspeople in South Korea
Brazilian expatriate sportspeople in Saudi Arabia
Saudi Professional League players
Association football midfielders